The South African AIDS Vaccine Initiative (SAAVI) was a South African organisation with the mission of coordinating the research and development of HIV vaccines in and for South Africa. The organization closed on 31 December 2012.

History
SAAVI was established in 1999 by the South African government as a project of the South African Medical Research Council. SAAVI frequently partnered with the HIV Vaccine Trials Network.

Funding problems
In June 2009, SAAVI announced that it was testing a new HIV vaccine candidate but suspended all further vaccine development indefinitely due to lack of funds.

References

External links
 

HIV/AIDS research organisations
HIV vaccine research
HIV/AIDS in South Africa
Medical research institutes in South Africa
Vaccination-related organizations
Medical and health organisations based in South Africa